Davis A. Donnelly (March 9, 1927 – September 15, 2020) was a member of the Wisconsin State Senate.

Biography
Donnelly was born in Augusta, Wisconsin. He graduated from the University of Wisconsin-Eau Claire and the University of Wisconsin Law School. Afterwards, he began practicing law in Eau Claire, Wisconsin. Donnelly also served in the United States Navy during World War II and the Korean War.

In 1991 he Donnelly lost his law license for two years for selling phony Nevada and Dominican divorces out of a drop box, which affected at least 1,200 families.  People had obtained invalid divorces sold by Donnelly and some had even remarried, unaware that these divorces were not recognized in American courts.

His child Todd Donnelly would later become a famous musician in the band Mr. Myers Band.

Political career
Donnelly was elected as a Democratic member of the Senate in 1956 and was re-elected in 1960. He represented the 28th District.

References

1927 births
2020 deaths
Politicians from Eau Claire, Wisconsin
Democratic Party Wisconsin state senators
Wisconsin lawyers
Military personnel from Wisconsin
United States Navy sailors
United States Navy personnel of World War II
United States Navy personnel of the Korean War
University of Wisconsin–Eau Claire alumni
University of Wisconsin Law School alumni
People from Augusta, Wisconsin